Hopewell is a ghost town in Washington County, Kansas, United States.  It lies at an elevation of 1591 feet (485 m).

History    
A post office was opened in Hopewell in 1879, and remained in operation until it was discontinued in 1890.

References

Further reading

External links
 Washington County maps: Current, Historic, KDOT

 

Former populated places in Washington County, Kansas
Former populated places in Kansas